Dalbergia intibucana is a species of legume in the family Fabaceae.
It is found only in Honduras.

Sources
 

intibucana
Endemic flora of Honduras
Critically endangered flora of North America
Taxonomy articles created by Polbot
Taxobox binomials not recognized by IUCN